The Native American tribes in Virginia are the indigenous tribes who currently live or have historically lived in what is now the Commonwealth of Virginia in the United States of America.

All of the Commonwealth of Virginia used to be Virginia Indian territory. Indigenous peoples have occupied the region for at least 12,000 years. Their population has been estimated to have been about 50,000 at the time of European colonization. At contact, Virginian tribes belonged to tribes and spoke languages belonging to three major language families: roughly, Algonquian along the coast and Tidewater region, Siouan in the Piedmont region above the Fall Line, and Iroquoian in the interior, particularly the mountains. About 30 Algonquian tribes were allied in the powerful Powhatan paramount chiefdom along the coast, which was estimated to include 15,000 people at the time of English colonization.

Few written documents assess the traditions and quality of life of some of the various early tribes that populated the Virginia region. One account lists the observations of an Englishman who  encountered groups of Native peoples during his time in Virginia. The author notes the Virginia Natives' diet depended on cultivated corn, meat and fish from hunting, and gathered fruits. He noted they believed in an afterlife, and recorded differences in characteristics among Native nations based on region and the size of population.

Due to the early and extended history, by the post-Civil War period, most tribes had lost their lands and many had suffered decades of disruption and high mortality due to epidemics of infectious diseases. Because the Native Americans generally lacked reservations and some had intermarried with Europeans and African Americans, many colonists and later European-American residents of Virginia assumed that the Native Americans were disappearing. They did not understand that mixed-race descendants could be brought up as fully culturally Native American.

But many Native Americans maintained their cultures and became increasingly active in the late 20th century in asserting their identities. After struggling to gain recognition from the state and federal governments, six tribes gained Congressional support for recognition. As of January 29, 2018, Virginia has seven federally recognized tribes: the Pamunkey Indian Tribe, Chickahominy, Eastern Chickahominy, Upper Mattaponi, Rappahannock, Nansemond and Monacan. The latter six gained recognition through passage of federal legislation in the 21st century.

In addition, the Commonwealth of Virginia has recognized these seven and another four tribes, most since the late 20th century. Only two of the tribes, the Pamunkey and Mattaponi, have retained reservation lands assigned by 17th-century treaties made with the English colonists. In the late 20th century, state law established an official recognition process.

Federal legislation to provide recognition to six of Virginia's non-reservation tribes was developed and pushed over a period of 19 years. Hearings established that the tribes would have been able to meet the federal criteria for continuity and retention of identity as tribes, but they were disadvantaged by lacking reservations and, mostly, by racially discriminatory state governmental actions that altered records of Indian identification and continuity. In addition, some records were destroyed during the American Civil War and earlier conflicts.

State officials arbitrarily changed vital records of birth and marriage while implementing the Racial Integrity Act of 1924; they removed identification of individuals as Indian and reclassified them as either white or non-white (i.e. colored), according to the state's "one-drop rule" (most members of Virginia tribes are multiracial, including European and/or African ancestry), without regard for how people identified. This resulted in Indian individuals and families losing the documentation of their ethnic identities. Since the late 20th century, many of the tribes who had maintained cultural continuity reorganized and began to press for federal recognition. In 2015 the Pamunkey completed their process and were officially recognized as an Indian tribe by the federal government.

Following nearly two decades of work, federal legislation to recognize the six tribes was passed by Congress and signed by President Donald Trump on January 29, 2018.

History

16th century

The first European explorers in what is now Virginia were Spaniards, who landed at two separate places several decades before the English founded Jamestown in 1607. By 1525 the Spanish had charted the eastern Atlantic coastline north of Florida. In 1609, Francisco Fernández de Écija, seeking to deny the English claim, asserted that Lucas Vázquez de Ayllón's failed colony of San Miguel de Gualdape, which lasted the three months of winter 1526–27, had been near Jamestown. Modern scholars instead place this first Spanish colony within US boundaries as having been on an island off Georgia.

In 1542, Spanish explorer Hernando de Soto in his expedition to the North American continent encountered the Chisca people, who lived in present-day southwestern Virginia. In the spring of 1567, the conquistador Juan Pardo was based at Fort San Juan, built near the Mississippian culture center of Joara in present-day western North Carolina. He sent a detachment under Hernando Moyano de Morales into present-day Virginia. This expedition destroyed the Chisca village of Maniatique. The site was later was developed as the present-day town of Saltville, Virginia.

Meanwhile, as early as 1559–60, the Spanish had explored Virginia, which they called Ajacán, from the Chesapeake Bay while they sought a water passage to the west. They captured a Native man, possibly from the Paspahegh or Kiskiack tribe, whom they named Don Luis after they baptized him. They took him to Spain, where he received a Jesuit education. About ten years later, Don Luis returned with Spanish Jesuit missionaries to establish the short-lived Ajacán Mission. Native Americans attacked it in 1571 and killed all the missionaries.

English attempts to settle the Roanoke Colony in 1585–87 failed. Although the island site is located in present-day North Carolina, the English considered it part of the Virginia territory. The English collected ethnological information about the local Croatan tribe, as well as related coastal tribes extending as far north as the Chesapeake Bay.

There were no records of indigenous life before the Europeans started documenting their expeditions and colonization efforts. But scholars have used archaeological, linguistic and anthropological research to learn more about the cultures and lives of Native Americans in the region. Contemporary historians have also learned how to use the Native American oral traditions to explore their history.

According to colonial historian William Strachey, Chief Powhatan had slain the weroance at Kecoughtan in 1597, appointing his own young son Pochins as successor there. Powhatan resettled some of that tribe on the Piankatank River. (He annihilated the adult male inhabitants at Piankatank in fall 1608.)

In 1670 the German explorer John Lederer recorded a Monacan legend. According to their oral history, the Monacan, a Siouan-speaking people, settled in Virginia some 400 years earlier by following "an oracle," after being driven by enemies from the northwest. They found the Algonquian-speaking Tacci tribe (also known as Doeg) already living there. The Monacan told Lederer they had taught the Tacci to plant maize. They said that before that innovation, the Doeg had hunted, fished, and gathered their food.

Another Monacan tradition holds that, centuries prior to European contact, the Monacan and the Powhatan tribes had been contesting part of the mountains in the western areas of today's Virginia. The Powhatan had pursued a band of Monacan as far as the Natural Bridge, where the Monacan ambushed the Powhatan on the narrow formation, routing them. The Natural Bridge became a sacred site to the Monacan known as the Bridge of Mahomny or Mohomny (Creator).  The Powhatan withdrew their settlements to below the Fall Line of the Piedmont, far to the east along the coast.

Another tradition relates that the Doeg had once lived in the territory of modern King George County, Virginia.  About 50 years before the English arrived at Jamestown (i.e. c. 1557), the Doeg split into three sections, with one part moving to what became organized as colonial Caroline County, one part moving to Prince William, and a third part remaining in King George.

Houses

Another expression of the different cultures of the three major language groups were their practices in constructing dwellings, both in style and materials. The Monacan, who spoke a Siouan language, created dome-shaped structures covered with bark and reed mats.

The tribes of the Powhatan Confederacy spoke Algonquian languages, as did many of the Atlantic coastal peoples all the way up into Canada. They lived in houses they called yihakans/yehakins, and which the English described as "longhouses". They were made from bent saplings lashed together at the top to make a barrel shape. The saplings were covered with woven mats or bark. The 17th-century historian William Strachey thought since bark was harder to acquire, families of higher status likely owned the bark-covered houses. In summer, when the heat and humidity increased, the people could roll up or remove the mat walls for better air circulation.

Inside a Powhatan house, bedsteads were built along both long walls. They were made of posts put in the ground, about a foot high or more, with small cross-poles attached. One or more mats was placed on top for bedding, with more mats or skins for blankets. A rolled mat served as a pillow. During the day, the bedding was rolled up and stored so the space could be used for other purposes. There was little need for extra bedding because a fire was kept burning inside the houses to provide heat in the cold months. It would be used to repel insects during the warmer months.

Wildlife was abundant in this area. The buffalo were still plentiful in the Virginia Piedmont up until the 1700s. The Upper Potomac watershed (above Great Falls, Virginia) was once renowned for its unsurpassed abundance of wild geese, earning the Upper Potomac its former Algonquian name, Cohongoruton (Goose River). Men and boys hunted game, and harvested fish and shellfish. Women gathered greens, roots and nuts, and cooked these with the meats. Women were responsible for butchering the meat, gutting and preparing the fish, and cooking shellfish and vegetables for stew. In addition, women were largely responsible for the construction of new houses when the band moved for seasonal resources. Experienced women and older girls worked together to build the houses, with younger children assigned to assist.

17th century
In 1607, when the English made their first permanent settlement at Jamestown, Virginia, the area of the current state was occupied by numerous tribes of Algonquian, Siouan, and Iroquoian linguistic stock. Captain John Smith made contact with numerous tribes, including the Wicocomico. More than 30 Algonquian tribes were associated with the politically powerful Powhatan Confederacy (alternately Powhatan Chiefdom), whose homeland occupied much of the area east of the Fall Line along the coast. Each of the more than 30 tribes of this confederacy had its own name and chief (weroance or werowance, female weroansqua). All paid tribute to a paramount chief (mamanatowick) or Powhatan, whose personal name was Wahunsenecawh. Succession and property inheritance in the tribe was governed by a matrilineal kinship system and passed through the mother's line.

Below the fall line, related Algonquian groups, who were not tributary to Powhatan, included the Chickahominy and the Doeg in Northern Virginia. The Chickahomony were independent of the Powhatan. Powhatan's chiefdom was a confederacy that relied on the cooperation and willingness of other Algonquian groups. The Chickahominy insisted on governing themselves and on having equal footing with the Powhatan. If Powhatan wished to use them as warriors, he had to hire them and pay them in copper. The Accawmacke (including the Gingaskin) of the Eastern Shore, and the Patawomeck of Northern Virginia, were fringe members of the Confederacy. As they were separated by water from Powhatan's domains, the Accawmacke enjoyed some measure of semi-autonomy under their own paramount chief, Debedeavon, aka "The Laughing King".

The Piedmont and area above the fall line were occupied by Siouan-speaking groups, such as the Monacan and Manahoac. The Iroquoian-speaking peoples of the Nottoway and Meherrin lived in what is now Southside Virginia south of the James River.  Other tribes occupied mountain and foothill areas. The region beyond the Blue Ridge (including West Virginia) was considered part of the sacred hunting grounds. Like much of the Ohio Valley, it was depopulated during the later Beaver Wars (1670–1700) by attacks from the powerful Five Nations of the Iroquois from New York and Pennsylvania.

French Jesuit maps prior to that were labeled showing that previous inhabitants included the Siouan "Oniasont" (Nahyssan) and the Tutelo or "Totteroy," the former name of Big Sandy River — and another name for the Yesan or Nahyssan. (Similarly, the Kentucky River in Kentucky was said to be anciently known as the Cuttawah, i.e., "Catawba" River. The Kanawha River is believed to have been named centuries earlier to indicate a former homeland of the Conoy aka Piscataway.)

When the English first established the Virginia Colony, the Powhatan tribes had a combined population of about 15,000. Relations between the two peoples were not always friendly. After Captain John Smith was captured in the winter of 1607 and met with Chief Powhatan, relations were fairly good. The Powhatan sealed relationships such as trading agreements and alliances via the kinship between groups involved. The kinship was formed through a connection to a female member of the group.  Powhatan sent food to the English, and was instrumental in helping the newcomers survive the early years.

By the time Smith left Virginia in the fall of 1609, due to a gunpowder accident, relations between the two peoples had begun to sour. In the absence of Smith, Native affairs fell to the leadership of Captain George Percy. The English and Powhatan's men led attacks on one another in near succession under Percy's time as negotiator. With both sides raiding in attempts to sabotage supplies and steal resources, English and Powhatan relations quickly fell apart. Their competition for land and resources led to the First Anglo-Powhatan War.

In April 1613, Captain Samuel Argall learned that Powhatan's "favorite" daughter Pocahontas was residing in a Patawomeck village. Argall abducted her to force Powhatan to return English prisoners and stolen agricultural tools and weapons. Negotiations between the two peoples began. It was not until after Pocahontas converted to Christianity and married Englishman John Rolfe in 1614 that peace was reached between the two peoples. As noted, matrilineal kinship was stressed in Powhatan society. Pocahontas' marriage to John Rolfe linked the two peoples. 
The peace continued until after Pocahontas died in England in 1617 and her father in 1618.

After Powhatan's death, the chiefdom passed to his brother Opitchapan.  His succession was brief and the chiefdom passed to Opechancanough.  It was Opecancanough who planned a coordinated attack on the English settlements, beginning on March 22, 1622.  He wanted to punish English encroachments on Indian lands and hoped to run the colonists off entirely. His warriors killed about 350-400 settlers (up to one-third of the estimated total population of about 1,200), during the attack. The colonists called it the Indian massacre of 1622.  Jamestown was spared because Chanco, an Indian boy living with the English, warned the English about the impending attack.  The English retaliated. Conflicts between the peoples continued for the next 10 years, until a tenuous peace was reached.

In 1644, Opechancanough planned a second attack to turn the English out.  Their population had reached about 8,000.  His warriors again killed about 350-400 settlers in the attack.  It led to the Second Anglo-Powhatan War.  In 1646, Opechancanough was captured by the English. Against orders, a guard shot him in the back and killed him.  His death began the death of the Powhatan Confederacy. Opechancanough's successor, Necotowance signed his people's first treaty with the English in October 1646.

The 1646 treaty delineated a racial frontier between Indian and English settlements, with members of each group forbidden to cross to the other side except by special pass obtained at one of the newly erected border forts. By this treaty, the extent of the Virginia Colony open to patent by English colonists was defined as:

All the land between the Blackwater and York rivers, and up to the navigable point of each of the major rivers - which were connected by a straight line running directly from modern Franklin on the Blackwater, northwesterly to the Appomattoc village beside Fort Henry, and continuing in the same direction to the Monocan village above the falls of the James, where Fort Charles was built, then turning sharp right, to Fort Royal on the York (Pamunkey) river.

In 1658, English authorities became concerned that settlers would dispossess the tribes living near growing plantations and convened an assembly. The assembly stated English colonists could not settle on Indian land without permission from the governor, council, or commissioners and land sales had to be conducted in quarter courts, where they would be public record. Through this formal process, the Wicocomico transferred their lands in Northumberland County to Governor Samuel Mathews in 1659.

Necotowance thus ceded the English vast tracts of uncolonized land, much of it between the James and Blackwater Rivers. The treaty required the Powhatan to make yearly tribute payment to the English of fish and game, and it also set up reservation lands for the Indians.  All Indians were at first required to display a badge made of striped cloth while in white territory, or they could be murdered on the spot. In 1662, this law was changed to require them to display a copper badge, or else be subject to arrest.

Around the year 1670, Seneca warriors from the New York Iroquois Confederacy conquered the territory of the Manahoac of Northern Piedmont. That year the Virginia Colony had expelled the Doeg from Northern Virginia east of the fall line. With the Seneca action, the Virginia Colony became de facto neighbours of part of the Iroquois Five Nations. Although the Iroquois never settled the Piedmont area, they entered it for hunting and raiding against other tribes. The first treaties conducted at Albany between the two powers in 1674 and 1684 formally recognized the Iroquois claim to Virginia above the Fall Line, which they had conquered from the Siouan peoples. At the same time, from 1671 to 1685, the Cherokee seized what are now the westernmost regions of Virginia from the Xualae.

In 1677, following Bacon's Rebellion, the Treaty of Middle Plantation was signed, with more of the Virginia tribes participating.  The treaty reinforced the yearly tribute payments, and a 1680 annexe added the Siouan and Iroquoian tribes of Virginia to the roster of Tributary Indians.  It allowed for more reservation lands to be set up. The treaty was intended to assert that the Virginia Indian leaders were subjects of the King of England.

In 1693 the College of William and Mary officially opened.  One of the initial goals of the college was to educate Virginia Indian boys.  Funding from a farm named "Brafferton," in England, were sent to the school in 1691 for this purpose.  The funds paid for living expenses, classroom space, and a teacher's pay.  Only children of treaty tribes could attend, but at first none of them sent their children to the colonial school. By 1711, Governor Spotswood offered to remit the tribes' yearly tribute payments if they would send their boys to the school.  The incentive worked and that year, the tribes sent twenty boys to the school.  As the years passed, the number of Brafferton students decreased. By late in the 18th century, the Brafferton Fund was diverted elsewhere. From that time, the college was restricted to ethnic Europeans (or whites) until 1964, when the federal government passed civil rights legislation ending segregation in public facilities.

18th century

Among the early Crown Governors of Virginia, Lt. Governor Alexander Spotswood had one of the most coherent policies toward Native Americans during his term (1710–1722), and one that was relatively respectful of them. He envisioned having forts built along the frontier, which Tributary Nations would occupy, to act as buffers and go-betweens for trade with the tribes farther afield. They would also receive Christian instruction and civilization.  The Virginia Indian Company was to hold a government monopoly on the thriving fur trade. The first such project, Fort Christanna, was a success in that the Tutelo and Saponi tribes took up residence. But, private traders, resentful of losing their lucrative share, lobbied for change, leading to its break-up and privatization by 1718.

Spotswood worked to make peace with his Iroquois neighbours, winning a concession from them in 1718, of all the land they had conquered as far as the Blue Ridge Mountains and south of the Potomac. This was confirmed at Albany in 1721. This clause was to be a bone of contention decades later, as it seemed to make the Blue Ridge the new demarcation between the Virginia Colony and Iroquois land. But the treaty technically stated that this mountain range was the border between the Iroquois and the Virginia Colony's Tributary Indians. White colonists considered this license to cross the mountains with impunity, which the Iroquois resisted. This dispute, which first flared in 1736 as Europeans began to settle the Shenandoah Valley, came to a head in 1743. It was resolved the next year by the Treaty of Lancaster, settled in Pennsylvania.

Following this treaty, some dispute remained as to whether the Iroquois had ceded only the Shenandoah Valley, or all their claims south of the Ohio.  Moreover, much of this land beyond the Alleghenies was disputed by claims of the Shawnee and Cherokee nations.  The Iroquois recognized the English right to settle south of the Ohio at Logstown in 1752.  The Shawnee and Cherokee claims remained, however.

In 1755 the Shawnee, then allied with the French in the French and Indian War, raided an English camp of settlers at Draper's Meadow, now Blacksburg, killing five and abducting five. The colonists called it the Draper's Meadow Massacre. The Shawnee captured Fort Seybert (now in West Virginia) in April 1758. Peace was reached that October with the Treaty of Easton, where the colonists agreed to establish no further settlements beyond the Alleghenies.

Hostilities resumed in 1763 with Pontiac's War, when Shawnee attacks forced colonists to abandon frontier settlements along the Jackson River, as well as the Greenbrier River now in West Virginia, the associated valleys on either side of the Allegheny ridge, and the latter just beyond the Treaty of Easton limit. Meanwhile, the Crown's Proclamation of 1763 confirmed all land beyond the Alleghenies as Indian Territory. It attempted to set up a reserve recognizing native control of this area and excluding European colonists. Shawnee attacks as far east as Shenandoah County continued for the duration of Pontiac's War, until 1766.

Many colonists considered the Proclamation Line adjusted in 1768 by the Treaty of Hard Labour, which demarcated a border with the Cherokee nation running across southwestern Virginia, and by the Treaty of Fort Stanwix, by which the Iroquois Six Nations formally sold the British all their claim west of the Alleghenies, and south of the Ohio.  However, this region (which included the modern states of Kentucky, and West Virginia, as well as southwestern Virginia) was still populated by the other tribes, including the Cherokee, Shawnee, Lenape, and Mingo, who were not party to the sale. The Cherokee border had to be readjusted in 1770 at the Treaty of Lochaber, because European settlement in Southwest Virginia had already moved past the 1768 Hard Labour line. The following year the Native Americans were forced to make further land concessions, extending into Kentucky. Meanwhile, the Virginian settlements south of the Ohio (in West Virginia) were bitterly challenged, particularly by the Shawnee.

The resulting conflict led to Dunmore's War (1774). A series of forts controlled by Daniel Boone began to be built in the valley of the Clinch River during this time. By the Treaty of Camp Charlotte concluding this conflict, the Shawnee and Mingo relinquished their claim south of the Ohio. The Cherokee sold Richard Henderson a portion of their land encompassing extreme southwest Virginia in 1775 as part of the Transylvania purchase. This sale was not recognized by the royal colonial government, nor by the Chickamauga Cherokee war chief Dragging Canoe. But, contributing to the Revolution, settlers soon began entering Kentucky by rafting down the Ohio River in defiance of the Crown. In 1776, the Shawnee joined Dragging Canoe's Cherokee faction in declaring war on the "Long Knives" (Virginians). The chief led his Cherokee in a raid on Black's Fort on the Holston River (now Abingdon, Virginia) on July 22, 1776 (see Cherokee–American wars (1776–94)). Another Chickamauga leader, Bob Benge, also continued to lead raids in the westernmost counties of Virginia during these wars, until he was slain in 1794.

In August 1780, having lost ground to the British army in South Carolina fighting, the Catawba Nation fled their reservation and took temporary refuge in an unknown hiding spot in Virginia. They may have occupied the mountainous region around Catawba, Virginia in Roanoke County, which had not been settled by European Americans. They remained there in safety around nine months, until American general Nathanael Greene led them to South Carolina, after the British were pushed out of that region near the end of the Revolution.

In the summer of 1786, after the United States had gained independence from Great Britain, a Cherokee hunting party fought a pitched two-day battle with a Shawnee one at the headwaters of the Clinch in present-day Wise County, Virginia. It was a victory for the Cherokee although losses were heavy on both sides. This was the last battle between these tribes within the present limits of Virginia.

Throughout the 18th century, several tribes in Virginia lost their reservation lands. Shortly after 1700, the Rappahannock tribe lost its reservation; the Chickahominy tribe lost theirs in 1718, and the Nansemond tribe sold theirs in 1792 after the American Revolution.  After losing their reservations, these tribes faded from the public record. Some of their landless members intermarried with other ethnic groups and became assimilated.  Others maintained ethnic and cultural identification despite intermarriage. In their matrilineal kinship systems, children of Indian mothers were considered born into her clan and family, and Indian regardless of their fathers. By the 1790s, most of the surviving Powhatan tribes had converted to Christianity, and spoke only English.

19th century
During this period, ethnic Europeans continued to push the Virginia Indians off the remaining reservations and end their status as tribes.  By 1850, one of the reservations was sold to the whites, and another reservation was officially divided by 1878. Many Virginia Indian families held onto their individual lands into the 20th century.  The only two tribes to resist the pressure and hold onto their communal reservations were the Pamunkey and Mattaponi tribes.  These two tribes still maintain their reservations today.

After the Civil War, the reservation tribes began to reclaim their cultural identities. They asserted their identity in the Commonwealth of Virginia.  They wanted to demonstrate that the Powhatan Indian descendants had maintained their cultural identity and were proud of their heritage. This was particularly important after the emancipation of slaves. The colonists and many white Virginians assumed that the many Indians of mixed race were no longer culturally Indian. But, they absorbed people of other ethnicities; especially if the mother was Indian, the children were considered to be members of her clan and tribe.

20th century
In the early 20th century, many Virginia Indians began to reorganize into official tribes. They were opposed by Walter Ashby Plecker, the head of the Bureau of Vital Statistics in Virginia (1912–1946). Plecker was a white supremacist and a follower of the eugenics movement, which had racial theories related to mistaken ideas about the superiority of the white race. Given the history of Virginia as a slave society, he wanted to keep the white "master race" "pure." In 1924 Virginia passed the Racial Integrity Act (see below), establishing the one drop rule in law, by which individuals having any known African ancestry were to be considered African, or black.

Because of intermarriage and the long history of Virginia Indians not having communal land, Plecker believed there were few "true" Virginia Indians left. According to his beliefs, Indians of mixed race did not qualify, as he did not understand that Indians had a long practice of intermarriage and absorbing other peoples into their cultures. Their children may have been of mixed race but they identified as Indian. The U.S. Department of the Interior accepted some of these "non Indians" as representing all of them when persuading them to cede lands.

The 1924 law institutionalized the "one-drop rule", defining as black an individual with any known black/African ancestry. According to the Pocahontas Clause, a white person in Virginia could have a maximum blood quantum of one-sixteenth Indian ancestry without losing his or her legal status as white. This was a much more stringent definition than had prevailed legally in the state during the 18th and 19th centuries. Before the Civil War, a person could legally qualify as white who had up to one-quarter (equivalent to one grandparent) African or Indian ancestry. In addition, many court cases dealing with racial identity in the antebellum period were decided on the basis of community acceptance, which usually followed how a person looked and acted, and whether they fulfilled community obligations, rather than analysis of ancestry, which most people did not know in detail anyway.

A holdover from the slavery years and Jim Crow, which still prevailed in the racially segregated state, the act prohibited marriage between whites and non-whites. It recognized only the terms of "white" and "colored" (which was related to ethnic African ancestry). Plecker was a strong proponent for the Act. He wanted to ensure that blacks were not "passing" as Virginia Indians, in his terms.  Plecker directed local offices to use only the designations of "white" or "colored" on birth certificates, death certificates, marriage certificates, voter registration forms, etc. He further directed them to evaluate some specific families which he listed, and to change the classification of their records, saying he believed they were black and trying to pass as Indian.

During Plecker's time, many Virginia Indians and African Americans left the state to escape its segregationist strictures. Others tried to fade into the background until the storm passed. Plecker's "paper genocide" dominated state recordkeeping for more than two decades, but declined after he retired in 1946. It destroyed much of the documentation that had shown families continuing to identify as Indian.

The Racial Integrity Act was not repealed until 1967, after the ruling of the US Supreme Court case Loving v. Virginia, which stated anti-miscegenation laws were unconstitutional. In the ruling the court stated: "The freedom to marry, or not marry, a person of another race lies with the individual and cannot be infringed by the State."

In the late 1960s, two Virginia organizations applied for federal recognition through the BAR under the Bureau of Indian Affairs. The Ani-Stohini/Unami first petitioned in 1968 and the Rappahannock filed shortly thereafter. The B.I.A. later told tribal leaders that they had lost the Ani-Stohini/Unami petition; they said that during the American Indian Movement takeover of the Interior Building in 1972, many documents were lost or destroyed. The Rappahannock tribe was recognized by the State of Virginia. Today, at least 13 tribes in Virginia have petitioned for federal recognition.

With the repeal of the Racial Integrity Act, individuals were allowed to have their birth certificates and other records changed to note their ethnic Indian identity (rather than black or white "racial" classification), but the state government charged a fee. After 1997, when Delegate Harvey Morgan's bill HB2889 passed to correct this injustice, any Virginia Indian who had been born in Virginia could have his or her records changed for free to indicate identity as Virginia Indian.

In the 1980s, the state officially recognized several tribes in a process authorized under legislation. The tribes had struggled to be recognized, against issues of racial discrimination. Because of their long history of interaction with European Americans, only two tribes had retained control of reservation lands established during the colonial period. Their "landless" condition added to their difficulty in documenting historic continuity of their people, as outsiders assumed that without a reservation, the Indians had assimilated to the majority culture. Another three tribes were recognized by the state in 2010.

21st century
The population of Powhatan Indians today in total is estimated to be about 8,500–9,500. About 3,000–3,500 are enrolled as tribal members in state-recognized tribes. In addition, the Monacan Nation has tribal membership of about 2,000.

The organized tribes, which developed from kinship and geographic communities, establish their own requirements for membership, as well as what they consider its obligations. Generally, members must pay dues; attend tribal meetings (which are usually monthly in the "home" areas); volunteer to serve as a tribal officer when asked; help to put on tribal events; belong to the tribal church (if one exists and they are able); teach their children their people's history and pass on traditional crafts; volunteer to represent the tribe at the Virginia Council on Indians, the United Indians of Virginia, or at other tribes' powwows; speak at engagements for civic or school groups; and live in a good way, so as to best represent their tribe and Native Americans in general. Most Indian tribes maintain some traditions from before the time of European settlement, and are keen to pass these on to their children. Although Indians are also highly involved in non-native culture and employment, they regularly engage in activities for their individual tribes, including wearing regalia and attending powwows, heritage festivals, and tribal homecomings. Individuals try to maintain a balance between elements of their traditional culture and participating in the majority culture.

The Pamunkey and the Mattaponi are the only tribes in Virginia to have maintained their reservations from the 17th-century colonial treaties.  These two tribes continue to make their yearly tribute payment to the Virginia governor, as stipulated by the 1646 and 1677 treaties.  Every year around Thanksgiving they hold a ceremony to pay the annual tribute of game, usually a deer, and pottery or a ceremonial pipe.

In 2013, the Virginia Department of Education released a 25-minute video, "The Virginia Indians: Meet the Tribes," covering both historical and contemporary Native American life in the state.

The Rappahannock tribe purchased back a part of their ancestral homeland April 1, 2022.  The tribe substantially increased their holdings January 2023.

Tribes recognized by Virginia 

The Commonwealth of Virginia passed legislation in 2001 to develop a process for state recognition of Native American tribes within the state.

As of 2010, the state has recognized a total of 11 tribes, eight of them related to historic tribes that were members of the Powhatan paramountcy. The state also recognizes the Monacan Nation, the Nottoway, and the Cheroenhaka (Nottoway), who were outside the paramountcy. Descendants of several other Virginia Indian and Powhatan-descended tribes still live in Virginia and other locations.

 Cheroenhaka (Nottoway) Indian Tribe. Letter of Intent to Petition 12/30/2002. Receipt of Petition 12/30/2002. State recognized 2010; in Courtland, Southampton County.
 Chickahominy Tribe. Letter of Intent to Petition 03/19/1996. State recognized 1983; in Charles City County. In 2009, Senate Indian Affairs Committee endorsed a bill that would grant federal recognition.
 Eastern Chickahominy Indians Tribe Letter of Intent to Petition 9/6/2001. State recognized, 1983; in New Kent County. In 2009, Senate Indian Affairs Committee endorsed a bill that would grant federal recognition.
 Mattaponi Tribe  (a.k.a. Mattaponi Indian Reservation). Letter of Intent to Petition 04/04/1995. State recognized 1983; in Banks of the Mattaponi River, King William County. The Mattaponi and Pamunkey have reservations based in colonial-era treaties ratified by the colony in 1658. Pamunkey Tribe's attorney told Congress in 1991 that the tribes state reservation originated in a treaty with the crown in the 17th century and has been occupied by Pamunkey since that time under strict requirements and following the treaty obligation to provide to the Crown a deer every year, and they've done that (replacing Crown with Governor of Commonwealth since Virginia became a Commonwealth)
 Monacan Nation (formerly Monacan Indian Tribe of Virginia). Letter of Intent to Petition 07/11/1995. State recognized 1989; in Bear Mountain, Amherst County. In 2009, Senate Indian Affairs Committee endorsed a bill that would grant federal recognition.
 Nansemond Indian Tribal Association, Letter of Intent to Petition 9/20/2001. State recognized 1985; in Cities of Suffolk and Chesapeake. In 2009, Senate Indian Affairs Committee endorsed a bill that would grant federal recognition.
 Nottoway Indian Tribe of Virginia, recognized 2010; in Capron, Southampton County.
 Pamunkey Nation, recognized 1983; in Banks of the Pamunkey River, King William County. Federally recognized by the Bureau of Indian Affairs 2015.
  Patawomeck Indians of Virginia recognized 2010; in Stafford County.
 Rappahannock Indian Tribe (I) (formerly United Rappahannock Tribe). Letter of Intent to Petition 11/16/1979. State recognized 1983; in Indian Neck, King & Queen County. In 2009, Senate Indian Affairs Committee endorsed a bill that would grant federal recognition.
 An unrecognized tribe, Rappahannock Indian Tribe (II), also uses this name.
 Upper Mattaponi Tribe  (formerly Upper Mattaponi Indian Tribal Association). Letter of Intent to Petition 11/26/1979. State recognized 1983; in King William County. In 2009, Senate Indian Affairs Committee endorsed a bill that would grant federal recognition.

In 2009 the governor established a Virginia Indian Commemorative Commission to develop a plan to run a competition for a monument to be located in Capitol Square to commemorate Native Americans in the state. Some elements have been developed, but the statue has not yet been installed.

Federal recognition 
Various bills before Congress have proposed granting federal recognition for the six non-reservation Virginia Tribes. Recent sponsors of such Federal recognition bills have been Senator George Allen, R-Va and Rep. Jim Moran, D-Va. These bills would grant federal recognition to the Chickahominy, Eastern Chickahominy, Upper Mattaponi, Rappahannock and Nansemond Tribes, and Monacan Indian Nation. These are six non-reservation tribes whose members have demonstrated continuity of community, as noted by state recognition. Federal recognition of these tribes would compensate for some of the historic injustices they suffered under Virginia government, and recognize their continuing identities as Virginia Indians and American citizens. On January 29, 2018, President Donald Trump signed legislation into effect that granted federal recognition to these tribes.  In May 2018, $1.4 million in grants was awarded to these tribes by the Department of Housing and Urban Development, reported by the Suffolk News Herald.

On May 8, 2007, the US House of Representatives passed a bill extending federal recognition to the six tribes mentioned above, but it was not passed by the Senate.

On March 9, 2009 the Thomasina E. Jordan Indian Tribes of Virginia Federal Recognition Act of 2009 was sent to the House Committee on Natural Resources.  Hearings for the bill were heard before the committee on March 18, 2009 and on April 22, 2009, the committee referred the bill to the US House of Representatives.  On June 3, 2009, the House approved the bill and the following day it was introduced in the Senate, where it was read twice and referred to the Committee on Indian Affairs, which approved the bill on October 22. On December 23, 2009 the bill was placed on the Senate Legislative Calendar under general orders. This is the furthest the bill has gotten in the Congressional process.

The bill has a hold on it placed for "jurisdictional concerns." Senator Tom Coburn (R-Ok.) believes that requests for tribal recognition should be processed through the Bureau of Indian Affairs, a process the Virginia tribes cannot use. So many of their records were destroyed under Walter Plecker that they would be unable to satisfy BIA documentation requirements of cultural continuity. The hold prevented the bill from reaching the Senate floor, and it died with the end of the Congressional session.

On February 17, 2011, two bills that would grant the six non-reservation Virginia Indian tribes federal recognition were introduced in the 112th Congress, one in the Senate (S.379) and one in the House of Representatives (H.R.783). The Senate bill was referred to the Senate Committee on Indian Affairs. The House bill was referred to the House Committee on Natural Resources, who referred it to the Subcommittee on Indian and Alaska Native Affairs on February 25.

On July 28, 2011, the Senate Committee on Indian Affairs ordered the Senate version of the bill "to be reported without amendment favorably."

The two reservation tribes, the Pamunkey and Mattaponi, are not part of the federal recognition bill.  The Pamunkey were granted independent federal recognition by the Bureau of Indian Affairs in 2015. The Mattaponi are also applying for federal recognition via the BIA, under current regulations and administrative process.

Unrecognized organizations 
More than a dozen unrecognized organizations claim to be Native American tribes, including many Cherokee heritage groups. These groups are neither federally or state-recognized tribes. One such organization, the Ani-Stohini/Unami Nation petitioned the U.S. government Bureau of Acknowledgement and Research for federal recognition in 1968. In 1972, The Bureau of Indian Affairs stated that they had lost the petition. The tribe filed a complaint that has yet to be addressed by the Bureau. In 1994, the tribe again submitted a letter of intent to petition. They are listed as petitioners #150. however, their petition has not been resolved.

See also

 Native American agriculture in Virginia
 Unrecognized tribes in Virginia

References

Suggested reading

External links
 Virginia Council on Indians 
 Brigid Schulte, "With Trip to England, Va. Tribes Seek a Place in U.S. History", Washington Post, 13 Jul 2006
 Thomasina E. Jordan Indian Tribes of Virginia Federal Recognition Act of 2007 , Library of Congress
 Brigid Schulte, "As Year's End Nears, Disappointment: Va. Tribes Had Hoped Jamestown Events Would Help Them Gain Sovereign Indian Nation Status", Washington Post, 25 Nov 2007
 Virginia Indian Tribal Alliance for Life 
 Virginia Pow-Wow Schedule